Harshika Poonacha is an Indian actress born on 1 May 1993 who mainly works in Kannada films. She rose to fame with the 2008 Kannada film PUC.

Career
Harshika Poonacha started her career at the age of 15 by acting in PUC (2008 Kannada film) while she was doing her 12th Standard at Christ Junior College, Bangalore. After completing 12th standard, Harshika spent the next two months working as a television anchor by hosting shows like Nimmindha Nimagaagi, Hrudayadinda and Sarigamapa before beginning a professional course. Harshika then joined Cambridge Institute of Technology, Bangalore and completed her Bachelor of Engineering in Electrical. In 2012, she joined Maxpro Software Company and agreed to work for five days a month while working 21 days in films. She said Getting into films was an accident. I never dreamt of becoming an actress.

After PUC (2008 Kannada film), she acted in a Kodava language film Ponnamma,
a Konkani film Kazar and a Telugu film Edukondalavada Venkataramana Andaru Bagundali. In 2010, Harshika acted in an important role in Jackie with Puneeth Rajkumar, which catapulted her to an instant celebrity status. She later appeared in Thamassu with Shiva Rajkumar for which she won the Karnataka State Film Award for Best Supporting Actress, and played Ramya in Nariya Seere Kadha, in which Ravichandran played the lead role. She also acted in a film named Cycle opposite Shivarjun. She played the daughter of a crorepati who gets kidnapped for ransom in the comedy film 5 Idiots. In 2013, she first had two releases in a row, Cycle and Ale and her third release Managana Kaili Maanikya opposite Ramesh Aravind, which was her first comedy film, in July. Her two films, B3 a love story directed by Gana Shyam with Srikanth and Adwaitha an action-based film directed by MB Giriraj which has Ajay Rao in the lead, released both on 6 December.

She has signed her first Tamil film Anandha Thollai. She also has a Telugu film titled Panipuri coming up.

She also appeared in a video album Hoo Manase. She and her cousin Bhuvaan Ponannaa own a company called Glamgod Fashion and Events and conduct fashion shows and fashion weeks. She made her Bhojpuri debut from the film Hum Hai Raahi Pyar Ke with Pawan Singh in 2021.

Personal life
She was born in Ammathi, Kodagu district of Karnataka and she is the only daughter to her parents. She is a Bachelor of Engineering Graduate. Harshika's cousin  Bhuvan Ponnanna is a model, actor and Bigg Boss Kannada 4 contestant.

Filmography

References

External links
 
 

Living people
Year of birth missing (living people)
21st-century Indian actresses
Actresses from Karnataka
Actresses in Kannada cinema
Actresses in Konkani cinema
Actresses in Malayalam cinema
Actresses in Tamil cinema
Actresses in Telugu cinema
Bigg Boss Kannada contestants
Christ University alumni
Indian film actresses
Kodava people
People from Kodagu district